Calinichia (died  1439), better known as Lady Calinica and sometimes as Kalinikia (or ; Middle Bulgarian: Калиникіѧ, Kalinikĭę), was the second wife of Radu I, a 14th-century Wallachian voivode (ruler). Calinichia was of Greek origin, and was the mother of Mircea I of Wallachia. She was also possibly a Byzantine princess.

References 

14th-century births
1438 deaths
Royal consorts of Wallachia
Women of medieval Wallachia
14th-century Byzantine people
14th-century Byzantine women